Psyllototus is an extinct genus of flea beetles described from the late Eocene Rovno amber of Ukraine, and from the Baltic amber of Russia and Denmark. It was named by Konstantin Nadein and Evgeny Perkovsky in 2010, and the type species is Psyllototus progenitor. In 2016, a newly described extant flea beetle genus from Bolivia, Chanealtica, was found to be most similar to Psyllototus, based on the characters available for observation.

Species
The genus includes four species:
 Psyllototus doeberli Bukejs & Nadein, 2014
 Psyllototus groehni Bukejs & Nadein, 2013
 Psyllototus progenitor Nadein & Perkovsky, 2010
 Psyllototus viking Nadein, 2015

References

Prehistoric beetle genera
†
†
Eocene insects
Fossil taxa described in 2010
Prehistoric insects of Europe
Rovno amber
Baltic amber